The Maritime Regiment was a maritime academy of Cebu City, Philippines.  Said college is managed by Seacrest Maritime Foundation Inc.(SMFI), a non-profit organization. Known as The Maritime Regiment, it implements a regimental system of training. In 2007, to respond to the current trends of the maritime industry, the Maritime College of Southwestern University was re-established as The Maritime Regiment. In 2008, the college was recognized as a sister school of PMMA (Phil. Merchant Marine Academy) as its program gained recognition.

References
Maritime Regiment Blog

Maritime colleges in Oceania
1948 establishments in the Philippines
Educational institutions established in 1948